Haddenham is a village and civil parish in west Buckinghamshire, England. At the 2011 Census, the population of the civil parish was 4,502.

History
The place-name "Haddenham" is derived from the Old English Hǣdanhām, "Hǣda's Homestead" or, perhaps Hǣdingahām, "the home of the Hadding tribe". It is possible that the first villagers were members of the Hadding tribe from Haddenham in Cambridgeshire. It may be that the first Anglo-Saxons to settle in the Vale of Aylesbury were followers of Cuthwulf, from Cottenham in Cambridgeshire, who, according to the Anglo-Saxon Chronicles, marched southwest to the Thames after routing the British at the Battle of Bedcanford in 571. The Domesday Book of 1086 records the manor as Hedreham. In 1142 it was recorded as Hedenham.

From the Norman conquest of England until the Dissolution of the Monasteries the Convent of St Andrew in Rochester, Kent held the manor. The Crown held the manor for the remainder of the reign of Henry VIII. Thereafter it passed to his daughter Elizabeth I.

The village had a Royal charter as a market town between 1294 and 1301. The market was short-lived because the influential manor of Thame objected to losing trade to Haddenham.

Haddenham is one of only three "wychert (or whitchet) villages" in England. Wychert is a method of building with a white clay mixed with straw to make walls and buildings, which are then thatched or topped with red clay tiles.

Haddenham was long a stronghold of radicalism and in particular of the Buckinghamshire Farm Labourers Union established in 1872 by Edward Richardson of Dinton.

Haddenham used to have several more pubs than today. The Anchor and the Eight Bells at Church End are now private houses. The Waggon and Horses in High Street was converted into the Peking Rendezvous Chinese restaurant, but closed in 2013. The Red Lion in Church End also closed in 2013. A developer applied for planning permission to demolish the Red Lion and replace it with housing, but in 2014 Aylesbury Vale District Council rejected the application. The Green Dragon on Churchway, more recently converted into restaurant Twist at the Green Dragon, was officially closed when planning permission was granted to make it a private residence. The Rose and Thistle also permanently closed in 2019.

In 1906 the Great Western Railway opened the railway through the parish, with Haddenham railway station to serve the village. In 1963 British Railways closed the station but kept the line open. In 1987 BR opened  station at a new site, a few hundred yards west of the old one. The railway is part of what is now the Chiltern Main Line.

Haddenham War Memorial, situated near the village pond at Church End, is a Grade II Listed Building.

Churches

The Church of England parish church of St Mary the Virgin is of 12th-century Norman origin but parts of may still remain from its first building, which was Saxon. William II granted the parish to the Benedictine abbey of Rochester, Kent.

There is also a Roman Catholic church, and Baptist and Methodist chapels. 

The Haddenham Methodist Church is built of wychert. One of the walls of the church collapsed on July 4, 2001, but was rebuilt, amid a call from the vicar to demolish the existing church and rebuild it with new materials, as wychert buildings are expensive to maintain. Haddenham Museum, which opened in 1998, is in the Methodist Chapel schoolroom.

Economy and amenities

Haddenham is known for its ponds which were used to breed Aylesbury ducks. Breeding has been revived recently on the pond in front of the parish church.

Haddenham has two pubs: the Kings Head and the Rising Sun. One former pub, House of Spice (Indian, formerly The Crown), is now a restaurant. There are three cafés: Little Italy at the station, Norsk at Fort End and Tickety Brew on the Parade.

Haddenham has a baker, a greengrocer, a barber shop, three hairdresser's and some smaller retailers. Haddenham has also a garden centre and a farm shop, further hosting amenities such as a florist, pet shops, a charity shop, and a tattoo parlour. Haddenham has two gyms: FitLife and The Garage, also at Bradmoor.

Haddenham has an industrial estate next to the small grass-strip airfield, a commercial district, and Haddenham and Thame Parkway railway station on the Chiltern Main Line that links , Oxford railway station and London Marylebone.

Haddenham has a community Infant School, Haddenham Junior School and the voluntary aided Haddenham St Mary's Church of England School. Haddenham is in the catchment area for Prince Risborough upper school and grammar schools: Aylesbury Grammar School, Aylesbury High School and Sir Henry Floyd Grammar School in Aylesbury.

Also in Haddenham is Tiggywinkles, the animal welfare charity and veterinary hospital, and the village hosts a biennial beer festival.

Haddenham NAG
Haddenham is policed by the Haddenham and District Neighbourhood Policing team based at the police station in Waddesdon. They work with the community via the Haddenham Neighbourhood action group. Representatives from the various villages in the area meet every six weeks to discuss neighbourhood priorities and to put forward plans to reduce crime.

Haddenham in transition

The village has a transition group, part of the Transition network that organises activities to improve the community's resilience and awareness of the changes to living standards, energy and resource security. The group was founded as Transition Thame and District but in autumn 2010 refocussed on Haddenham and in February 2011 became officially recognised as a transition initiative.

Notable people
Haddenham is the birthplace of British composer Doreen Carwithen (1922–2003).

The astronomer William Rutter Dawes (1799–1868) had his home and private observatory in the village from 1857 to 1868.

The architect Peter Aldington (1933–present) and his wife Margaret have their home in Haddenham.  He is one of a very select group of architects branded by English Heritage as the "living listed" and together with John Craig founded his own practice in the village in 1970.

Peter Parrott, an RAF pilot who fought in the Battle of Britain, was born in Haddenham.

Media
Haddenham has been the setting for a number of television programmes including Jeeves and Wooster, Rosemary & Thyme and eight episodes of Midsomer Murders.

The village appears in the second Muppet film, The Great Muppet Caper. Having been forced to fly in an aeroplane's baggage hold, Kermit the Frog, Fozzie Bear and Gonzo are thrown out of the plane and land in Haddenham's Church End pond.

The duck pond has recently been used as a backdrop for a Halifax advert featuring the Thunderbirds.

The duck pond area in Haddenham was recently used to film episodes of Pennyworth which tells the story of Alfred Pennyworth, Bruce Wayne's Butler from DC's Batman Universe.

References

Further reading

External links

Haddenham Parish Council
Haddenham.net

Turn End Trust 

Civil parishes in Buckinghamshire
Villages in Buckinghamshire